Gerhana Skacinta is a Malaysian band that specializes in the musical style of ska. The name is composed of gerhana 'eclipse', ska, and cinta 'love'. Although based in a country far from more famous centers of ska culture, the music of the band is not a fusion of Caribbean and Southeast Asian genres, but instead pure, traditional ska style. They are signed to the Clockwork Records label. The band is influenced by bands such as The Skatalites, Lord Kitchener and The Wailers.

Discography
 Tribute to Sweet Charity (2001) - A tribute album
 Skali Skale (2002) - A singles album.
 Boss Sounds (2002) - Their first full album.
 The New Authentic (2004) - Their second full album.
 This Is Ska (2007) - Third Full Album Of GSC
 Maju Haikal (2008) - Full Album Of GSC

External links
Gerhana Skacinta on Myspace

Malaysian musical groups
Third-wave ska groups